Iowa District Courts are the state trial courts of general jurisdiction in the U.S. state of Iowa.

They have original jurisdiction in civil cases with any amount in controversy; felony criminal cases, domestic relations, family law, and cases involving minors cases (including adoption, dependency, juvenile delinquency, and  probate cases).

Judicial Personnel and Structure
Judicial magistrates primarily serve their home county and have jurisdiction over simple misdemeanors, local infractions, and small claims. They have authority to order warrants, conduct preliminary hearings, and hear other simple issues. Most magistrates are attorneys, though it is not mandated by law. They serve four-year terms and are appointed by county commissions.

Associate juvenile judges only have jurisdiction over juvenile court matters. They are able to issue orders, make findings, and official decisions in juvenile cases, juvenile delinquency cases, adoption, and parental rights issues. They serve six-year terms, and are appointed by district judges for the judicial district after being selected by a county commission.

Associate probate judges have limited jurisdiction to probate cases. They are able to audit accounts, and perform other duties as ordered by the chief judge over the course of their six-year terms. They are appointed by the district court judge after having been selected by a county commission.

District associate judges have the same jurisdiction as judicial magistrates, with additional authority to hear more serious misdemeanors, civil suits up to $10,000, and certain juvenile cases. District associate judges are appointed by the district judge after having been selected by a county commission for a six-year term.

District judges have the authority to hear any case within the district. Felony criminal cases, adoptions, state administration issues, and many other matters come before these judges. These judges are appointed by the governor, from a list of nominees from a state nominating commission. The term for a district judge is six years.

Each county has a clerk of the district court who manages and maintains all trial records in the county.

Court attendants facilitate court proceedings, and aid with clerical work.

Court reporters transcribe all official statements in the courtroom, making the court record.

Juvenile court officers work with youth who are accused of delinquent acts, to oversee the treatment and restitution of the young person in question.

Regions of Jurisdiction
There are 8 judicial districts, each encompassing five or more of Iowa's 99 counties.

1st Judicial District - Allamakee County, Iowa; Black Hawk County, Iowa; Buchanan County, Iowa; Chickasaw County, Iowa; Clayton County, Iowa; Delaware County, Iowa; Dubuque County, Iowa; Fayette County, Iowa; Grundy County, Iowa; Howard County, Iowa; Winneshiek County, Iowa
Chief Judge: Kellyann M. Lekar
2nd Judicial District - Boone County, Iowa; Bremer County, Iowa; Butler County, Iowa; Calhoun County, Iowa; Carroll County, Iowa; Cerro Gordo County, Iowa; Floyd County, Iowa; Franklin County, Iowa; Greene County, Iowa; Hamilton County, Iowa; Hancock County, Iowa; Hardin County, Iowa; Humboldt County, Iowa; Marshall County, Iowa; Mitchell County, Iowa; Pocahontas County, Iowa; Sac County, Iowa; Story County, Iowa; Webster County, Iowa; Winnebago County, Iowa; Worth County, Iowa; Wright County, Iowa
Chief Judge: Kurt L. Wilke
3rd Judicial District - Buena Vista County, Iowa; Cherokee County, Iowa; Clay County, Iowa; Crawford County, Iowa; Dickinson County, Iowa; Emmet County, Iowa; Ida County, Iowa; Lyon County, Iowa; Kossuth County, Iowa; Monona County, Iowa; O'Brien County, Iowa; Osceola County, Iowa; Palo Alto County, Iowa; Plymouth County, Iowa; Sioux County, Iowa; Woodbury County, Iowa
Chief Judge: Duane E. Hoffmeyer
4th Judicial District - Audubon County, Iowa; Cass County, Iowa; Fremont County, Iowa; Harrison County, Iowa; Mills County, Iowa; Montgomery County, Iowa; Page County, Iowa; Pottawattamie County, Iowa; Shelby County, Iowa
Chief Judge: Jeffrey L. Larson
5th Judicial District - Adair County, Iowa; Adams County, Iowa; Clarke County, Iowa; Dallas County, Iowa; Decatur County, Iowa; Guthrie County, Iowa; Jasper County, Iowa; Lucas County, Iowa; Madison County, Iowa; Marion County, Iowa; Polk County, Iowa; Ringgold County, Iowa; Taylor County, Iowa; Union County, Iowa; Warren County, Iowa; Wayne County, Iowa
Chief Judge: Arthur E. Gamble
6th Judicial District - Benton County, Iowa; Iowa County, Iowa; Johnson County, Iowa; Jones County, Iowa; Linn County, Iowa; Tama County, Iowa
Chief Judge: Marlita Greve
7th Judicial District - Cedar County, Iowa; Clinton County, Iowa; Jackson County, Iowa; Muscatine County, Iowa; Scott County, Iowa
Chief Judge: 
8th Judicial District - Appanoose County, Iowa; Davis County, Iowa; Des Moines County, Iowa; Henry County, Iowa; Jefferson County, Iowa; Keokuk County, Iowa; Lee County, Iowa; Louisa County, Iowa; Mahaska County, Iowa; Monroe County, Iowa; Poweshiek County, Iowa; Van Buren County, Iowa; Wapello County, Iowa; Washington County, Iowa
Chief Judge: Mary Ann Brown

See also

Outline of Iowa
Index of Iowa-related articles
State of Iowa
Governor of Iowa
Lieutenant Governor of Iowa
Iowa General Assembly
Iowa Senate
Iowa House of Representatives
Courts of Iowa
United States of America
United States Congress
United States congressional delegations from Iowa
List of United States senators from Iowa
Iowa's congressional districts
List of United States representatives from Iowa

References

External links
The official website of the Iowa Judicial Branch
National Center for State Courts – directory of state court websites.

Iowa state courts
Courts and tribunals with year of establishment missing